George Alexander (May 21, 1814 – October 13, 1903) was an Ontario farmer and political figure. He was a Conservative member of the Senate of Canada from 1873 to 1891.

He was born in Banffshire, Scotland in 1814 and studied at Aberdeen University. He was a director of the Bank of Upper Canada and served as president of the provincial Agricultural Association. Alexander was elected to the Legislative Council of the Province of Canada for Gore district in 1858. He was named to the Senate for Woodstock division in 1873 and resigned in 1891.

External links

The Canadian parliamentary companion and annual register, 1881, CH Mackintosh

1814 births
1903 deaths
Members of the Legislative Council of the Province of Canada
Canadian senators from Ontario
Conservative Party of Canada (1867–1942) senators
Scottish emigrants to pre-Confederation Ontario
Alumni of the University of Aberdeen